In particle physics, the Klein–Nishina formula gives the differential cross section (i.e. the "likelihood" and angular distribution) of photons scattered from a single free electron, calculated in the lowest order of quantum electrodynamics. It was first derived in 1928 by Oskar Klein and Yoshio Nishina, constituting one of the first successful applications of the Dirac equation. The formula describes both the Thomson scattering of low energy photons (e.g. visible light) and the Compton scattering of high energy photons (e.g. x-rays and gamma-rays), showing that the total cross section and expected deflection angle decrease with increasing photon energy.

Formula 
For an incident unpolarized photon of energy , the differential cross section is:

 

where

  is the classical electron radius (~2.82 fm,  is about 7.94 × 10−30 m2 or 79.4 mb)
  is the ratio of the wavelengths of the incident and scattered photons
  is the scattering angle (0 for an undeflected photon).

The angular dependent photon wavelength (or energy, or frequency) ratio is
 

as required by the conservation of relativistic energy and momentum (see Compton scattering).

Polarized photons 
If the incoming photon is polarized, the scattered photon is no longer isotropic with respect to the azimuthal angle. For a linearly polarized photon scattered with a free electron at rest, the differential cross section is instead given by:
 
where  is the azimuthal scattering angle.

Limits

Low energy 
For low energy photons the wavelength shift becomes negligible and the Klein–Nishina formula reduces to the classical Thomson expression:
 
which is symmetrical in the scattering angle, i.e. the photon is just as likely to scatter backwards as forwards. With increasing energy this symmetry is broken and the photon becomes more likely to scatter in the forward direction.

High energy 
For high energy photons it is useful to distinguish between small and large angle scattering. For large angles, where , the scatter ratio  is large and
 
showing that the (large angle) differential cross section is inversely proportional to the photon energy.

The differential cross section has a constant peak in the forward direction:
 

Total cross section 
The differential cross section may be integrated to find the total cross section. 

In the low energy limit there is no energy dependence and we recover the Thomson cross section (~66.5 fm2):

History 
The Klein–Nishina formula was derived in 1928 by Oskar Klein and Yoshio Nishina, and was one of the first results obtained from the study of quantum electrodynamics. Consideration of relativistic and quantum mechanical effects allowed development of an accurate equation for the scattering of radiation from a target electron. Before this derivation, the electron cross section had been classically derived by the British physicist and discoverer of the electron, J.J. Thomson. However, scattering experiments showed significant deviations from the results predicted by the Thomson cross section. Further scattering experiments agreed perfectly with the predictions of the Klein–Nishina formula.

See also
 Synchrotron radiation
 Yoshio Nishina
 Oskar Klein

References

Further reading

Quantum electrodynamics
Scattering